Pixbo Wallenstam Innebandyklubb, also known as Redfox or Pixbo IBK, is a Swedish floorball club, based in Mölnlycke, Västra Götaland.  It plays in the Swedish Super League. Pixbo IBK won the Swedish Championships in 2002 and  2003, the European Championship (now the EuroFloorball Cup) in 2004, and the Swedish Ligacup in 2008.

External links
 Pixbo Wallenstam IBK official website

Sports teams in Sweden
Swedish floorball teams